Alexander Ramsey (1815–1903) was a U.S. Senator from Minnesota from 1863 to 1875. Senator Ramsey may also refer to:

Ambrose Ramsey (died 1805), North Carolina State Senate
Ben Ramsey (politician) (1903–1985), Texas State Senate
Joseph H. Ramsey (1816–1894), New York State Senate
Ron Ramsey (born 1955), Tennessee State Senate
Ronald Ramsey Sr. (born 1959), Georgia State Senate
James Graham Ramsay (1823–1903), North Carolina State Senate